Makris Group is a privately owned South Australian based retail property group. The company focuses on sub-regional shopping centres.

Shopping centres 
Makris Group has the following shopping centres:

 North Adelaide Village Shopping Centre
 City Cross Shopping Centre - Adelaide CBD
 Marina Pier Holdfast Shores
 Hallett Cove  Shopping Centre
 Gilles Plains Shopping Centre
 Bonnyrigg Plaza, Bonnyrigg, New South Wales
 Endeavour Hills Shopping Centre

Additionally it has two CBD office buildings, a hotel and a development site:
 Manpower House - Adelaide CBD
 Optus Centre - Adelaide CBD
 The Oxford Hotel - North Adelaide
 88 O'Connell Street - former LeCornu site in North Adelaide

References

External links 
 Makris Group

Privately held companies of Australia
Shopping center management firms